WKRK (1320 AM) is a radio station broadcasting a southern gospel format and is affiliated with Singing News Radio. Licensed to Murphy, North Carolina; it has been owned by the Radford family since July 20, 1995, and features a popular tradio show called PartyLine as well as hourly SRN News.

WKRK's daytime signal reaches Western North Carolina, North Georgia, and East Tennessee.  WKRK is found at 1320 AM and as of Easter weekend 2016, WKRK began broadcasting at 105.5 FM.  The station is simulcast on Channel 25 through The Cable Company serving Cherokee County, North Carolina.

References

External links

KRK
Southern Gospel radio stations in the United States
Radio stations established in 1958
1958 establishments in North Carolina